Philautus mjobergi is a species of frog in the family Rhacophoridae. It is endemic to northern Borneo and found in Kalimantan (Indonesia) and Sarawak (Malaysia). The specific name mjobergi honours Eric Mjöberg, a Swedish naturalist, ethnographer, and explorer. Common names Murud bubble-nest frog and Mjöberg's bush frog have been coined for it.

Description
Adult males measure  and adult females  in snout–vent length. The appearance is stocky. The head is broader than it is long. The snout is rounded to elliptical. The tympanum is obscure. The finger and toe tips bear fleshy fringes and broad, oval discs; the fingers have rudimentary webbing while the more heavily webbed. The dorsal ground colour is pale grey to dark chestnut; the pattern is highly variable and may include bars, stripes, and mottling, or be plain. The iris is brown or goldish and has a horizontal dark bar.

Habitat and conservation
The eggs may be laid in pitcher plants.

This species may not be threatened because most logging occurs at lower elevations, although this statement is based on a higher lower limit for this species (1500 m) than found in other sources (800 m). It occurs in several protected areas, including Kinabalu Park and Gunung Mulu National Park.

References

mjobergi
Nepenthes infauna
Endemic fauna of Borneo
Amphibians of Indonesia
Amphibians of Malaysia
Amphibians described in 1925
Taxa named by Malcolm Arthur Smith
Taxonomy articles created by Polbot
Amphibians of Borneo